La Pernelle is a commune in the Manche department in Normandy in north-western France.

Places of interest
 The panorama from the top of the hill extends from coast West of the Phare de Gatteville to Saint-Vaast-la-Hougue and beyond, along the South-Eastern coast of the Manche department.
 The town hall is one of the smallest in France. 
 The replica of the Grotto of Our Lady of Lourdes.

See also
Communes of the Manche department

References

Pernelle